In classical mechanics, a central force on an object is a force that is directed towards or away from a point called center of force.

Not all central force fields are conservative or spherically symmetric. However, a central force is conservative if and only if it is spherically symmetric or rotationally invariant.

Properties
Central forces that are conservative can always be expressed as the negative gradient of a potential energy:

(the upper bound of integration is arbitrary, as the potential is defined up to an additive constant).

In a conservative field, the total mechanical energy (kinetic and potential) is conserved:

(where 'ṙ' denotes the derivative of 'r' with respect to time, that is the velocity,'I' denotes moment of inertia of that body and 'ω' denotes angular velocity), and in a central force field, so is the angular momentum:

because the torque exerted by the force is zero. As a consequence, the body moves on the plane perpendicular to the angular momentum vector and containing the origin, and obeys Kepler's second law. (If the angular momentum is zero, the body moves along the line joining it with the origin.)

It can also be shown that an object that moves under the influence of any central force obeys Kepler's second law. However, the first and third laws depend on the inverse-square nature of Newton's law of universal gravitation and do not hold in general for other central forces.

As a consequence of being conservative, these specific central force fields are irrotational, that is, its curl is zero, except at the origin:

Examples
Gravitational force and Coulomb force are two familiar examples with  being proportional to 1/r2 only. An object in such a force field with negative  (corresponding to an attractive force) obeys Kepler's laws of planetary motion.

The force field of a spatial harmonic oscillator is central with  proportional to r only and negative.

However, there exist other force fields, which have some closed orbits.

See also
 Classical central-force problem
 Particle in a spherically symmetric potential

Notes

References

Force
Classical mechanics